Richard Louis Duchossois (pronounced DUCH-ah-swah; October 7, 1921 – January 28, 2022) was an American businessman and racehorse owner. He was the founder and chairman of The Duchossois Group, Inc., a family-owned company headquartered in Elmhurst, Illinois that is known for its ownership stakes in Arlington Park and Churchill Downs race tracks, as well as for rail car and defense manufacturing.

Early life and education 
Duchossois was the son of Ernestine (Hoessler) and Alphonse Duchossois. He graduated from Morgan Park Military Academy and attended Washington and Lee University, before starting active military service during World War II.

Military career 
He served in five European campaigns, including Normandy where he was a commander with the 610th Tank Destroyer Battalion of the United States Army. He served as the military governor for the region of Eichstätt and attained the rank of Major before he was released from active service in 1946.  He received a Purple Heart for his injuries in combat at the Moselle River.

Career
Richard Duchossois joined Thrall Car Manufacturing Company after World War II and became CEO in 1952. In 1980, the firm purchased Chamberlain Manufacturing Corp., with Duchossois becoming its chairman.  At the same time, he retained the chairmanship of the parent company, but appointed his son as CEO.

In 1983, as Chairman of renamed Duchossois Industries (DII), he purchased Arlington Park Race Track. In 2000, Arlington Park merged with Churchill Downs Incorporated, where DII has several seats on the board of directors.

He also owned Des Moines TV Station KDSM-TV (formerly KCBR-TV) from 1983 to 1991.

He served as a director of TCMC, Inc., the Emirates World Series of Racing, and the Thoroughbred Racing Association.

Personal life and death 
He married his high school sweetheart, Beverly Thrall. His son Craig J. Duchossois is chief executive officer of The Duchossois Group, Inc. and served as chairman of the Board of Visitors of the United States Naval Academy. Duchossois celebrated his 100th birthday in October 2021, and died on January 28, 2022, in Barrington Hills, Illinois.

Awards and honors
He received a Purple Heart and two Bronze Stars for his military service in World War II.

His awards include the 1986 American Jockey Club's Gold Medal, the 1988 Special Sovereign Award from the Jockey Club of Canada, and Lord Derby Award from the Horserace Writers and Reporters Association of Great Britain, the Joe Palmer Award for Meritorious Service to Racing from the National Turf Writers Association, the 2003 Eclipse Award of Merit, and in 2019 inducted into the Chicagoland Sports Hall of Fame. That same year, Duchossois was voted into the National Museum of Racing and Hall of Fame as one of its esteemed Pillars of the Turf.

He received an honorary Doctor of Laws degree from Washington and Lee.  In 2015, Washington and Lee University honored him with the Washington Award.

With his wife Judi in 2014, they received the Sword of Loyola award from Loyola University Chicago for their philanthropy.

See also
 Arlington Classic
 Beverly D. Stakes
 Eclipse Special Award 
 Pucker Up Stakes
 Sussex Stakes

References

 Duchossois Industries website
 Los Angeles Times article, August 19, 2000
 NTRA Eclipse Award

External links
 USMA West Point Oral History interview of Richard Duchossois http://www.westpointcoh.org/interviews/seek-strike-destroy-a-tank-destroyer-commander-rolls-across-europe
 National World War II Museum Oral History Interview of Richard Duchossois http://www.ww2online.org/terms/3957?page=10

1921 births
2022 deaths
American business executives
American sports businesspeople
American centenarians
Businesspeople from Chicago
Military personnel from Illinois
Men centenarians
Morgan Park Academy alumni
Washington and Lee University alumni
United States Army personnel of World War II
People from Barrington, Illinois
American horse racing industry executives
United States Thoroughbred Racing Hall of Fame inductees
American racehorse owners and breeders
Churchill Downs executives
Eclipse Award winners
United States Army officers